Cook's Tourists' Handbooks were a series of travel guide books for tourists published in the 19th-20th centuries by Thomas Cook & Son of London. The firm's founder, Thomas Cook, produced his first handbook to England the 1840s, later expanding to Europe, Near East, North Africa, and beyond. Compared with other guides such as Murray's, Cook's aimed at "a broader and less sophisticated middle-class audience." The books served to advertise Cook's larger business of organizing travel tours. The series continues today as Traveller Guides issued by Thomas Cook Publishing of Peterborough, England.

List of Cook's travel guides by geographic coverage

Belgium
 
 
 1880 ed.

China

France
 Cook's Guide to Paris
 
 1900 ed.
 1905 ed.

Germany

Great Britain
 
 1998 reprint
 
 
 
 1905 ed.
 1911 ed.
 1921 ed.

India

Italy
 
 1875 ed.
 1901 ed.
 
 1901 ed.
 
 1884 ed.

Netherlands
 
 
 1880 ed.

New Zealand
 
 1903 ed.

North Africa
 
  + index
 1905 ed.
 
 
   + Index
 1911 ed.
 1921 ed.

Palestine and Syria
 Cook's Tourists' Handbook to Palestine and Syria  1876 edition

Scandinavia
 Cook's Handbook to Scandinavia
 Sweden
 
  + Index

Spain

Switzerland
 
 
 1879 ed.
 1905 ed.
 1922 ed.

Syria
  + Index
  + Index

See also
 Thomas Cook European Timetable

References

External links
 WorldCat. Thomas Cook Touring Handbooks

Travel guide books
Series of books
Publications established in 1845